Sadam may refer to:

JK Tallinna Sadam, defunct Estonian football team
Sodam, village in Andhra Pradesh, India
Variant spelling of Saddam
Sadam Koumi, sprinter
Sadam Ali, boxer